General elections were held in Uruguay on Sunday, 27 October 2019 to elect the President and General Assembly. As no presidential candidate received a majority in the first round of voting, a runoff election took place on 24 November.

In the 2014 elections, the left-wing Broad Front had won a third consecutive election with absolute majorities in both houses of the General Assembly. The Broad Front's term in office еarned support through the creation of a large welfare system, but at the same time was undermined by an increasing budget deficit, along with rising unemployment and a spike in violence. The election campaign focused primarily around the issue of crime, with each party proposing different solutions. A constitutional referendum on amendments proposed by opposition senator Jorge Larrañaga was held alongside the elections. The amendments proposed the introduction of a National Guard and tougher security measures.

As incumbent president Tabaré Vázquez was unable to seek re-election due to constitutional term limits, the Broad Front nominated former Montevideo mayor Daniel Martínez as its presidential candidate. The National Party nominated its 2014 candidate Luis Lacalle Pou, the Colorado Party nominated the economist Ernesto Talvi, and the new Open Cabildo party nominated former commander-in-chief of the Uruguayan Army, Guido Manini Ríos.

Heading into the elections, most opinion polls predicted a run-off between Martínez and Lacalle Pou, along with the loss of the Broad Front's congressional majority and the growth of Open Cabildo. In the first round of voting, the Broad Front saw its worst results since the 1999 elections, but Martínez still received the most votes in the 11-candidate field and qualified for the runoff along with Lacalle Pou, who subsequently received support from most of the eliminated opposition parties. In the runoff, Lacalle Pou defeated Martínez by just over 37,000 votes in a tight race, with the final result only declared after the counting of absentee ballots. Martinez conceded defeat four days after the election, saying that the outstanding absentee ballots would not be enough to overcome Lacalle Pou's lead in preliminary results.

The elections marked the first loss for the Broad Front in a presidential election since 1999, with Lacalle Pou becoming the first National Party president since his father, Luis Alberto Lacalle de Herrera, who held office from 1990 to 1995.

Background
The 2014 elections had resulted in a third consecutive victory for the Broad Front. Former president Tabaré Vázquez was returned to office for a second non-consecutive term, having previously served as president from 2004 to 2009. The Broad Front also won an absolute majority in the General Assembly. Vázquez was ineligible to run again due to constitutional term limits. As a result, the governing Broad Front had to nominate a new candidate.

The economy had seen continued growth since 2003, allowing the government to invest heavily in social programs, pensions and health care. However, improved poverty and inequality ratios came at the cost of a budget deficit that reached 4.8 percent of GDP by the end of August 2019. According to political analysts, the Broad Front was predicted to lose its congressional majority, which combined with an increase in the number of parties expected to win seats in Congress, would make coalition negotiations difficult.

Electoral system
The elections were held using the double simultaneous vote method, whereby voters cast a single vote for the party of their choice for all three of the Presidency, the Senate and the Chamber of Representatives.

The President of Uruguay was elected using the two-round system, with a run-off held when no candidate received 50% of the vote in the first round. The 30 members of the Senate were elected by proportional representation in a single nationwide constituency. The vice president, elected on the same ballot as the president, becomes president of the Senate, with their vote being the casting one when Senate votes are tied. The 99 members of the Chamber of Representatives were elected by closed list proportional representation in 19 multi-member constituencies based on the departments. Seats were allocated using the highest averages method.

Presidential candidates
Presidential primaries were held on 30 June to select the candidates:

Campaign slogans

Opinion polls

Results
On 25 November, preliminary results in the runoff election showed Lacalle Pou narrowly ahead by 28,666 votes over Martínez, which delayed the announcement of a winner as 35,229 absentee vote needed to be counted. However, on 28 November, while these ballots were still being counted, Martínez conceded the race after concluding that they would not reverse Lacalle Pou's preliminary lead. On 30 November, final votes counts confirmed Lacalle Pou as the winner over Martínez.

By department

Notes

References

External links

 Official results 

Uruguay
General election
Elections in Uruguay
Uruguay
Uruguay
Luis Alberto Lacalle Pou